Barbara Beable (née Poulsen; born 14 May 1949) is a former New Zealand shot putter and pentathlete.

Biography
At the 1970 British Commonwealth Games she won a silver medal in the women's shot put. She competed at two more British Commonwealth Games in 1974 and 1978, in 1974 she finished 5th in both the women's shot put and pentathlon. Then in 1978 she placed 7th in the pentathlon.

References

External links 
 

1949 births
New Zealand female shot putters
Commonwealth Games silver medallists for New Zealand
Athletes (track and field) at the 1970 British Commonwealth Games
Athletes (track and field) at the 1974 British Commonwealth Games
Athletes (track and field) at the 1978 Commonwealth Games
Commonwealth Games medallists in athletics
Living people
Medallists at the 1970 British Commonwealth Games